The submarine hull number No. 361 named Great Wall #61 (长城61号) was a Chinese People's Liberation Army Navy Type 035AIP (ES5E variant) (NATO reporting name Ming III) conventional diesel/electric submarine. In April 2003, during a military exercise in the Yellow Sea between North Korea and China's Shandong Province, the vessel suffered a mechanical failure that killed all 70 crew members on board. It was one of China's worst peacetime military disasters. The PLA Navy's Commander Shi Yunsheng and Political Commissar Yang Huaiqing were both dismissed as a result of the accident.

Background

No. 361 was part of the 12th Submarine Brigade of the North Sea Fleet of the PLA Navy based at Lüshunkou in Liaoning Province. It was a Type 035G (Ming III-class) submarine.  These were clones of Soviet Project 633 a.k.a Romeo-class submarines, which themselves were clones of German World War II advanced Type XXI diesel/electric U-boats.

According to CNN, China was increasing training and exercises of its submarines in the east to carry out a policy of "sea denial" to counter the United States Pacific Fleet.

Fatal incident
According to the official Chinese news agency Xinhua, all 70 crew members died when the submarine's diesel engine used up all available oxygen (because it had failed to shut down properly) while the boat was submerged on April 16, 2003. The submarine, which was commanded by Commodore Cheng Fuming, had been taking part in naval exercises east of Inner Changshan Islands in the Yellow Sea off the coast of Northeastern China. Along with its normal complement, the crew included 13 trainee cadets from the Chinese naval academy.

After the disaster, the crippled submarine drifted for ten days because it was on a silent, no-contact exercise. The boat was discovered by Chinese fishermen who noticed its periscope sticking above the surface on April 25, 2003. The crew were slumped over at their stations, seemingly having died before becoming aware of any issue.

At a press conference on May 8, 2003, Foreign Ministry spokesperson Zhang Qiyue stated that while on an exercise east of Changshan Islands, the No. 361 submarine was incapacitated by a mechanical problem and all 70 on board had perished. The submarine had been towed to a port as of the time of the press conference. The submarine was initially towed to Yulin Harbor near Sanya on Hainan Island before being taken back to the northeast seaport of Dalian in Liaoning province.

Aftermath
On May 2, 2003, Central Military Commission (CMC) chairman Jiang Zemin said in a condolence message to the families of the dead that "the officers and sailors of 361 remembered their sacred duty entrusted to them by the Party and the people. They died on duty, sacrificed themselves for the country, and they are great losses to the People’s Navy."

CMC Vice-chairman Guo Boxiong led an enquiry into the incident, which resulted in the dismissal or demotion of five senior PLA Navy officers in June 2003: Navy Commander Shi Yunsheng (replaced by Zhang Dingfa) and Political Commissar Yang Huaiqing; North Sea Fleet Commander Ding Yiping, Political Commissar Chen Xianfeng, and Chief of Staff Xiao Xinnian. Ding Yiping had been groomed to be the candidate for Navy Commander, but was removed from contention after the accident. Admiral Wu Shengli eventually succeeded Zhang Dingfa as Commander.

References

External links
 Type 035 (Ming Class) Diesel-Electric Submarine
 Chinese Submarine Accident Kills 70 (Taiwanese Security Research)
 includes a picture of 361
 China sub deaths 'must rouse Navy' (BBC News)
 Sackings after China's sub disaster (BBC News)
 China sub victims 'suffocated' (BBC News)
 HK press seeks answers to sub accident (BBC News)
 Picture of Submarine 361

2003 disasters in China
Ming-class submarines
Ships built in China
1995 ships
Chinese submarine accidents
Maritime incidents in 2003
Ships lost with all hands
North Sea Fleet
Yellow Sea
Military history of Liaoning